Tieshan Township is a township in Hongjiang, Hunan, China. , it administers the following seven villages:
Tieshan Village
Liangzhuwan Village
Yuanjiaxi Village
Daduan Village
Shuikoushan Village
Xiaoxi Village
Subaoding Village

References 

Townships of Huaihua
Hongjiang